Diurodrilus is a genus of tiny marine animals that has traditionally been assigned to the annelid worms, although this affinity is not certain. With a maximum length of 0.45 mm, it has an unusual morphology with many traits not found in other annelids, including a ventral creeping foot. Analyses of DNA have both refuted and supported placement within the annelids, with the unusual morphology perhaps due to evolutionary progenesis, in which organisms develop sexual maturity while retaining the larval traits of their ancestors.

The following species are recognised:
 Diurodrilus minimus Remane, 1925
 Diurodrilus ankeli Ax, 1967
 Diurodrilus benazzii Gerlach, 1953
 Diurodrilus dohrni Gerlach, 1952
 Diurodrilus subterraneus Remane, 1934
 Diurodrilus westheidei Kristensen & Niilonen, 1982

References

Annelid genera